Enfermo amor is a 2022 Mexican romantic comedy-drama film directed by Marco Polo Constandse and Rodrigo Nava. The film features an ensemble cast consisting of Estefanía Hinojosa, Gonzalo Vega, Paco Rueda, Jesús Zavala, Natalia Téllez, Luis Arrieta, Daniel Tovar, Cassandra Sánchez Navarro, Alejandro de la Madrid, Camila Sodi, Eréndira Ibarra, Alberto Guerra, Mónica Huarte, Andrés Palacios, Fernanda Castillo, Adriana Louvier, Maya Zapata, Juan Pablo Medina. The movie is based on John Cariani's play Love/Sick, and was released by Vix+ on 27 July 2022.

Cast 
 Estefanía Hinojosa as Ana
 Gonzalo Vega as Fernando
 Paco Rueda as Santiago
 Jesús Zavala as Andrés
 Natalia Téllez as Luisa
 Luis Arrieta as Botarga
 Daniel Tovar as Sergio
 Cassandra Sánchez Navarro as Celia
 Alejandro de la Madrid as Memo
 Camila Sodi as Sara
 Eréndira Ibarra as Karla
 Alberto Guerra as Marco
 Mónica Huarte as Julia
 Andrés Palacios as Quique
 Fernanda Castillo as Liz
 Adriana Louvier as Sofía
 Maya Zapata as Emilia
 Juan Pablo Medina as Jaime
 Rebecca Jones as Celia's mother
 Enrique Singer as Celia's father
 Ricardo O'Farrill as Ricky

Production 
Principal photography began in May 2021 and wrapped in September 2021.

Release 
The film was released on 27 July 2022 by Vix+.

References

External links 
 

2022 romantic comedy films
Mexican romantic comedy films
2020s Spanish-language films
Vix (streaming service) original films